This is a list of butterflies of Saimbeyli, a district located on the middle section of the Taurus Mountains chain in the northern end of Adana Province in southern Turkey. In their three volumes of  Die Tagfalter der Türkei, Hesselbarth et al.  listed 121 butterfly species from Saimbeyli before 1995. The list was updated with 40 new species which have been recorded in several field studies between 2012 and 2016, and the number of species was determined as 161 in total. S. Wagener  argued that Saimbeyli is a valuable habitat for 11 endemic and 15 rare butterfly taxa, and the only locality for Polyommatus theresiae.

Hesperiidae

Lycaenidae

Nymphalidae

Papilionidae

Pieridae

See also
 List of butterflies of Turkey

References

External links
Ecotourism in Saimbeyli
AdaMerOs - Butterflies Observation & Photography Society in Turkey

Turkey
Saimbeyli
S